Lake Kalli is a lake of Estonia located in the east.

See also
List of lakes of Estonia

Kalli
Kastre Parish
Kalli